Notiotitanops (Greek for "big face of the south") is a brontothere endemic to North America.

References

Brontotheres
Eocene odd-toed ungulates
Eocene mammals of North America
Fossil taxa described in 1942